The North River is a  tidal river in southeastern Georgia, the United States.  It is a tributary of the St. Marys River, joining it just east of the city of St. Marys.

References

Rivers of Georgia (U.S. state)
Rivers of Camden County, Georgia